In Norse mythology, Ríg-Jarl or Jarl was a son of the god Ríg.  His wife Erna bore him eleven sons, the ancestors of the race of warriors in Norse society.

See also
Earl

Characters in Norse mythology
Legendary progenitors